The U.S.-Mexico Border Infectious Disease Surveillance Project (BIDS) was a bilateral project undertaken by the Centers for Disease Control and Prevention in cooperation with the Mexican government (specifically the Mexican Secretariat of Health) to promote bi-national border surveillance relating to the spread of harmful diseases between the two nations as well as to establish regional protocol.

Beginnings 

The development of the project began in 1997. Over a period of three years, a team of officials from both nations constructed an "active, sentinel surveillance system" over a series of 13 clinical sites.

The primary goal of the project was to demonstrate "that a binational effort with local, state, and federal participation can create a regional surveillance system that crosses an international border".

Investigations 

The BIDS project conducted investigations of reports concerning an outbreak of dengue fever in Texas and measles in California and Baja California.

References 

Centers for Disease Control and Prevention